Harvard Studies in Classical Philology (HSCPh) is a peer-reviewed academic journal covering topics in philology and classical studies, published annually. It was established in 1890 and is published by Harvard University Press.  The journal is abstracted and indexed by L'Année philologique.

References

External links 
 

Classics journals
Publications established in 1890
English-language journals
Harvard University academic journals
Harvard University Press academic journals